The Subcommittee on Social Security is a subcommittee of the Committee on Ways and Means in the United States House of Representatives.

Jurisdiction
From the House rules
The jurisdiction of the Subcommittee on Social Security shall include bills and matters referred to the Committee on Ways and Means that relate to the Federal Old-Age, Survivors’ and Disability Insurance System, the Railroad Retirement System, and employment taxes and trust fund operations relating to those systems. More specifically, the jurisdiction of the Subcommittee on Social Security shall include bills and matters involving title II of the Social Security Act and Chapter 22 of the Internal Revenue Code (the Railroad Retirement Tax Act), as well as provisions in title VII and title XI of the Act relating to procedure and administration involving the Old-Age, Survivors’ and Disability Insurance System.

Members, 117th Congress

Historical membership rosters

115th Congress

116th Congress

References

External links
 Website: Subcommittee Page

Ways and Means Social Security
Social security in the United States